The 2014–15 Lithuanian Football Cup is the twenty-six season of the Lithuanian annual football knock-out tournament. The competition started on 15 June 2014 with the matches of the first round and is scheduled to end in May 2015. Žalgiris are the defending champions.

The winners will qualify for the first qualifying round of the 2015–16 UEFA Europa League.

First round 
The matches started on 15 June 2014 and ended on 2 August 2014.

!colspan="3" align="center"|15 June

|-
!colspan="3" align="center"|16 June

|-
!colspan="3" align="center"|17 June

|-
!colspan="3" align="center"|18 June

|-
!colspan="3" align="center"|24 June

|-
!colspan="3" align="center"|26 June

|-
!colspan="3" align="center"|29 June

|-
!colspan="3" align="center"|10 July

|-
!colspan="3" align="center"|30 July

|-
!colspan="3" align="center"|1 August

|-
!colspan="3" align="center"|2 August

|}

Second round 
The matches started on 8 August 2014 and ended on 14 September 2014.

!colspan="3" align="center"|8 August

|-
!colspan="3" align="center"|29 August

|-
!colspan="3" align="center"|3 September

|-
!colspan="3" align="center"|9 September

|-
!colspan="3" align="center"|10 September

|-
!colspan="3" align="center"|14 September

|}

Third round

!colspan="3" align="center"|23 September

|-
!colspan="3" align="center"|24 September

|}

Fourth round

!colspan="3" align="center"|30 September

|-
!colspan="3" align="center"|1 October

|-
!colspan="3" align="center"|3 October

|}

Quarter-finals

|}

Semi-finals
 And. 20/04/15 Rit. 05/05/2015

|}

Final
The final was played on 23 May 2015.

|}

External links

Cup
Cup
2014–15 European domestic association football cups
2014-15